Buffalo meat is the meat of the water buffalo, a large bovid, raised for its milk and meat in many countries including India, Nepal, Pakistan, Bangladesh, Philippines, Bulgaria, Italy, Russia, Czech Republic, Slovakia, Australia and Egypt.

Buffalo meat is known by various names in different countries. In some places it is known as  red beef, or buff in India and Nepal; in some countries it is known as carabeef, from the Spanish term and breed name carabao. Meat taken from a buffalo younger than 20 months is known as padwa in India,  pado  in Nepal and bansgosh in Pakistan. Buffalo calves are often referred to as buffalo broilers and brought up exclusively on milk for the purpose of being slaughtered young for meat.

Social significance 
Due to the religious importance of cows and restrictions on beef in India and Nepal, there is a need to differentiate buffalo meat from beef. In countries like India, for religious reasons, a considerable part of the population does not eat beef (meat of cattle). In a large number of the Indian states and in Nepal, slaughtering cattle is prohibited.

Differences from beef
Water buffalo are a type of bovid, but their meat is different from beef in many respects. Buffalo meat has a lower fat content, and its fat is milky white, compared to the yellow-white fat of beef. Buffalo meat is darker in color, and buffaloes, because of their larger size, have harder bones than cows. Buffalo meat has a lower muscle pH of 5.6±0.4 whereas beef muscle has a pH of 6.4±0.7. It also has a significantly smaller amount of collagen in its muscles, but the species does not differ significantly in the degree of intramuscular collagen cross-linking.

Production

Buffalo have exceptional muscular development and thus they are considerably heavy, with some weighing more than a tonne. The main agricultural use of buffalo is to obtain milk. India has the largest number of buffalo and is the largest producer of its milk, producing nearly 57 million tonnes of it annually. This accounts for 67% of global production. Slaughtering buffalo for meat is a secondary agricultural priority.

Buffalo meat from young buffalo has a much better quality as they have a higher proportion of muscle and a lower proportion of fat as compared to other cattle meat. The highest quality buffalo meat is known as "padwa" in India, taken from a buffalo younger than 24 months.

India accounts for about 43% of the world buffalo meat production, with Uttar Pradesh producing the most, followed by Andhra Pradesh and Maharashtra. In the 21st century, buffalo meat production in India has been growing and has increased from 4.1 million tonnes CWE (carcass weight equivalent) in 2014 to 4.3 million tonnes CWE in 2015.

In India, during the calendar year 2014–2015, consumption estimates had been forecasted to rise from 3.1% and 3.5% to 2.1 and 2.175 million tonnes CWE respectively, according to the US Department of Agriculture.

Quality parameters of buffalo meat
For centuries buffalo have been used as draught animals as they have good muscular development. Buffalo are generally fed on coarse feeds; they convert them into the protein-rich lean meat. Buffalo can be suitably grown in countries having poor feed resources. Thus, buffalo are generally raised using straw crop residues and they are very cheap to feed. Some can work until the age of 30.

When buffalo are reared up to 24 months and fed with milk, their meat is of high quality. The buffen is lean and rich in protein and less fatty than  cattle. This has created a high demand for buffen among health-conscious consumers (Desmond, 1990). Buffalo may also be more resistant to disease than cattle. The nutrient requirements of buffalo steer constitute 1.8 kg TDN, 6.6 MCal ME, 0.24 kg DCP, 11 g P  and 14 g Ca. On ad libitum and high concentrate (75:25) based rations the growth rate is 610 g/day (with feed efficiency of 7:1). The protein content of buffalo meat is higher than chicken, and due to this buffalo meat is also called poor people’s protein.

Indian export
India is one of the world’s biggest exporters of buffalo meat. According to US Department of Agriculture, India leads over the next highest exporter Brazil. In 2015, India exported more than 2.4 million tonnes of buffalo meat and its allied products. Brazil exported 2 million tonnes and Australia 1.5 million tonnes. These two countries constitute 58.7% of all buffalo meat exports. India has 23.5% of global buffalo meat exports. In fiscal year 2014, the export share of India was 20%.

According to data obtained from Centre for Monitoring Indian Economy (CMIE), most of India’s export is to Asian countries, which import more than 80% while African countries import around 15%. Within Asia, Vietnam imports 45% of the buffalo meat exported from India.

Buffalo meat exports from India have been growing at an average of approximately 14% yearly since 2011 and fetched more than $4.8 billion in 2014. Last year was the first time India has earned more from the export of buffen than it did from Basmati rice exports.

Several databases, such as Agricultural Outlook and United Nations Food, show there is increasing trend of meat consumption in India. However, the data also show that the consumption of buffalo meat has been falling over the years. It has come down by (-) 44.5% in 2014 from 2000. This fall in consumption has been taking place because of an increase in the price of buffalo meat and health consciousness. Consumption of chicken went up by 31% in that period, showing that white meat is taking precedence over red meat.

Gallery

See also
 Beefalo
 Buffalo burger

References

Further reading
Kondaiah N (2002). Meat and by-products.In: Handbook of Animal Husbandry. 3rd revised edition. pp. 950–975. New Delhi, India: DIPA, ICAR.

External links

Water buffalo
Meat by animal